The year 556 BC was a year of the pre-Julian Roman calendar. In the Roman Empire, it was known as year 198 Ab urbe condita. The denomination 556 BC for this year has been used since the early medieval period, when the Anno Domini calendar era became the prevalent method in Europe for naming years.

Events
 Labashi-Marduk succeeds Neriglissar as king of Babylon.
 Pisistratus is expelled to Euboea from Athens, and makes his fortune from Thrace's mines.
 Nabonidus succeeds Labashi-Marduk as king of Babylon.

Births
 Simonides of Ceos, approximate date

Deaths
 Labashi-Marduk, king of Babylon
 Neriglissar, king of Babylon

References